The Men's 4x100 metre relay T11-T13 had its First Round held on September 15 at 19:04 and its Final on September 16 at 11:25.

Medalists

Results

References
Round 1 - Heat 1
Round 1 - Heat 2
Round 1 - Heat 3
Final

Athletics at the 2008 Summer Paralympics